Georgeville is a community on Cape George in Antigonish County, Nova Scotia, Canada.

St. George's Church is a two-storey, Gothic Revival Roman Catholic Church built between 1860 and 1871. It is a municipally designated heritage property valued for its association with the history of Roman Catholic settlement in the area.

References

Communities in Antigonish County, Nova Scotia